Bajka is a village and municipality in the Levice District in the Nitra Region of Slovakia.

History
In historical records the village was first mentioned in 1286.

Geography
It has a population of about 335 people.

Ethnicity
The village is about 73% Slovak and 27% Magyar.

Facilities
The village has a public library and a  football pitch.

Genealogical resources

The records for genealogical research are available at the state archive "Statny Archiv in Nitra, Slovakia"

 Roman Catholic church records (births/marriages/deaths): 1746–1757, 1779-1897
 Reformated church records (births/marriages/deaths): 1783-1895 (parish A)
 Census records 1869 of Bajka are not available at the state archive.

See also
 List of municipalities and towns in Slovakia

External links
https://web.archive.org/web/20100202015957/http://www.statistics.sk/mosmis/eng/run.html
Surnames of living people in Bajka

Villages and municipalities in Levice District